Leonardo Jaramillo was a Spanish mannerist painter, active in the 17th-century in the Viceroyalty of Peru (present-day Peru).

Biography 
Leonardo Jaramillo's birth date is unknown but he was probably born in Seville in the early 17th or late 16th century. He was likely trained or was influenced by Spanish painters Juan de las Roelas and Francisco Pacheco. 

Between 1613 to 1615, he moved to the Viceroyalty of Peru. Jaramillo taught painting to students including Tomás Ortiz de Olivares, Juan de Sotomayor, and Miguel de Vargas. His most known work is "La imposición de la casulla a san Ildefonso" (English: Bestow of the Chasuble upon San Ildefonso) (1636).

Notable works 
 Nuestra Señora de la Piedad con donantes, Belén Church, Cajamarca, Peru.
 El milagro de las aguas (mural) (1635–1640), Basilica and Convent of San Francisco, Lima, Peru
 San Francisco en la Porciúncula (mural) ( c. 1635–1640), Basilica and Convent of San Francisco, Lima, Peru
 La imposición de la casulla a san Ildefonso (1636), Convento de los Descalzos, Lima, Peru
 Cristo de la columna (1643), Cathedral Basilica of St. Mary, Trujillo, Perú.

References

Further reading 
 

Peruvian Mannerist painters
Spanish emigrants to Peru
Peruvian male painters
17th-century Spanish painters
Date of birth unknown
People from Seville